Anadenobolus monilicornis, known as the yellow-banded millipede or bumble bee millipede, is a species of millipede in the family Rhinocricidae. It is native to the Caribbean and has also been introduced to the southeastern United States.

Description
The legs and antennae are red.

Ecology and behaviour 
This species inhabits leaf litter. Birds and captive monkeys have been observed crushing these millipedes and rubbing their secretions on their wings or fur, potentially to repel insects. The secretions of millipedes may have some properties that repel insects.

Distribution
This species is native to the Caribbean: it is found in Brazil, Venezuela, Suriname, Guyana, and on Barbados, Trinidad and Tobago, St. Maarten, Martinique, Dominica, Guadeloupe, Jamaica, Puerto Rico and Haiti.

This species has been introduced to southern Florida, where it can occur in large numbers but is not considered a pest.

References 

Spirobolida
Animals described in 1876
Millipedes of South America
Taxa named by Carl Oscar von Porat